Maria Chapdelaine is a 1934 French drama film directed by Julien Duvivier and starring Madeleine Renaud, Jean Gabin and Jean-Pierre Aumont. It is an adaptation of the 1913 novel of the same title by Louis Hémon set in rural Quebec about a young woman who becomes involved with a farmer, trapper and an immigrant drifter from Paris. The story was adapted again for a 1950 film directed by Marc Allégret.

Cast
 Madeleine Renaud as Maria Chapdelaine 
 Jean Gabin as François Paradis 
 Jean-Pierre Aumont as Lorenzo Surprenant 
 Suzanne Desprès as Laura Chapdelaine 
 Gaby Triquet as Alma-Rose Chapdelaine 
 Maximilienne as Azelma Larouche 
 André Bacqué as Samuel Chapdelaine 
 Alexandre Rignault as Eutrope Gagnon 
 Daniel Mendaille as Le curé 
 Robert Le Vigan as Tit-Sèbe, le rebouteux 
 Thomy Bourdelle as Esdras Chapdelaine 
 Edmond Van Daële as Le docteur 
 Émile Genevois as Tit-Bé Chapdelaine 
 Fred Barry as Nazaire Larouche 
 Pierre Laurel as Ephrem Surprenant 
 Gustave Hamilton as Le vieux français 
 Julien Clément as Le marchand Bédard 
 Jacques Langevin as Edwige Légaré

Production
The film's sets were designed by art director Jacques Krauss. Location shooting took place in Canada around Lake Mistassini. Some post-production work was also done at the Neuilly Studios in Paris.

Reception
The film was a box office success on its release, ending a run of financial failures for Duvivier. The film was seen by 70,000 people in one week in Quebec. It was awarded the French Grand Prix, and was screened at the Venice Film Festival where it was given a Special Mention. A review in The New York Times praised it as "stirring, full-bodied and tremulously beautiful".

References

Works cited

Bibliography
 McCann, Ben. Julien Duvivier. Oxford University Press, 2017.

External links
 

1934 films
1934 drama films
French drama films
1930s French-language films
Films set in Quebec
Films shot in Quebec
Films directed by Julien Duvivier
Pathé films
Films based on French novels
French black-and-white films
1930s French films
Films shot at Neuilly Studios